Liaquatpur is a city and capital of Liaqatpur Tehsil in Rahim Yar Khan District, Punjab, Pakistan. It is located at 28°55'60N 70°57'0E with an altitude of 95 metres (314 feet).

See also
Liaquat Pur Railway station

External links
Aerial View of Liaquat Pur

Populated places in Rahim Yar Khan District